Limestone is a rural locality in the Rockhampton Region, Queensland, Australia.

History 
Limestone Provisional School opened circa 1891 and closed circa 1896.

Education 
There are no schools in Limestone. The nearest government primary and secondary schools are Mount Morgan State School and Mount Morgan State High School, both in neighbouring Mount Morgan to the west.

References 

Suburbs of Rockhampton Region
Localities in Queensland